Salterns Marina is a coastal area of Poole, Dorset. The marina is west of Lilliput.

History 
In April 2021, the demolition of the historic Salterns Hotel was started. A 150 million pound project is planned for the area.

Facilities 
Sailing is an activity held at the marina.

Politics 
Salterns Marina is part of the Poole parliamentary constituency.

References 

Areas of Poole
Marinas in England